The ordered exponential, also called the path-ordered exponential, is a mathematical operation defined in non-commutative algebras, equivalent to the exponential of the integral in the commutative algebras.  In practice the ordered exponential is used in matrix and operator algebras.

Definition 

This restriction is necessary as products in the algebra are not necessarily commutative.

The operation maps a parameterized element onto another parameterized element, or symbolically,

There are various ways to define this integral more rigorously.

Product of exponentials 

The ordered exponential can be defined as the left product integral of the infinitesimal exponentials, or equivalently, as an ordered product of exponentials in the limit as the number of terms grows to infinity:

The ordered exponential is in fact a geometric integral.

Solution to a differential equation 

The ordered exponential is unique solution of the initial value problem:

Solution to an integral equation 

The ordered exponential is the solution to the integral equation:

This equation is equivalent to the previous initial value problem.

Infinite series expansion 

The ordered exponential can be defined as an infinite sum,

This can be derived by recursively substituting the integral equation into itself.

Example 

 

When integrating above equation it holds (now,  is the connection operator expressed in a coordinate basis)

 

with the path-ordering operator  that orders factors in order of the path .

 

Hence, it holds the group transformation identity . If  is a smooth connection, expanding above quantity to second order in infinitesimal quantities  one obtains for the ordered exponential the identity with a correction term that is proportional to the  curvature tensor.

See also

 Path-ordering (essentially the same concept)
 Magnus expansion
 Product integral
 List of derivatives and integrals in alternative calculi
 Indefinite product
Fractal derivative

References

External links
 Non-Newtonian calculus website

Abstract algebra
Ordinary differential equations
Non-Newtonian calculus